Thievery may refer to:

Theft
Thievery Corporation, a music band